Who Is the Champion? (Vietnamese : Ai là nhà vô địch ?) is a 2003 Vietnamese computer-animated sport film produced by Hanoi Film Productions.

Plot
A golden buffalo and a brown bear compete in weightlifting to see who will become the 2003 Southeast Asian Games champion.

Music
The song "For the world of tomorrow" was composed by Nguyễn Quang Vinh and sung by Linh Dung.

References
 Who is the champion ? - First animated film  about 22nd SEA Games - Việt Báo // Friday, September 12, 2003 (15:14 ~ GMT+7)
Vietnamese animated films
Vietnamese computer-animated films
Vietnamese children's films
Vietnamese sports films
Films about animals playing sports
2003 films